Peperomia warmingii is a species of Peperomia subshrub native to Minas Gerais, Brazil. It grows in wet tropical biomes.   It produces drupes.

Etymology
The species' epithet warmingii came from the surname of Johannes Eugenius Bülow Warming, who was a Danish botanist and ecologist from Copenhagen that had written a textbook about plant ecology.

References

warmingii
Flora of South America
Flora of Brazil
Plants described in 1908
Taxa named by Casimir de Candolle